Camille Zaidan was the Archeparch of the Maronite Catholic Archeparchy of Antelias in Lebanon.

Life
Camille Zaidan received his ordination to the priesthood on October 23, 1971. On June 6, 2011, he was elected bishop by Synod of Maronite bishops in Antioch. Pope Benedict XVI confirmed on 13 August of the same year his nomination and appointed him titular bishop of Ptolemais in Phoenicia dei Maroniti.

Maronite Patriarch of Antioch, Bechara Boutros al-Rahi, OMM, ordained him bishop on 23 September of the same year and his co-consecrators were the Archeparch Emeritus of Antelias, Joseph Mohsen Béchara, and the Emeritus Curial Bishop of Antioch, Samir Mazloum.

In June 2012, the Synod of Bishops of the Maronite Church elected him Archbishop of Antelias. Pope Benedict XVI confirmed his appointment to the office on 16 June 2012.

References

External links
 http://www.catholic-hierarchy.org/bishop/bzaidan.html 

1944 births
2019 deaths
Lebanese Maronites
21st-century Maronite Catholic bishops